Francis Bernard Heptonstall (19 October 1925 – 27 July 2018) better known by the stage name Bernard Hepton,  was an English theatre director and actor. Best known for his stage work and television roles in teleplays and series, he also appeared briefly on radio and in film.

Early life and education
Hepton was born in Bradford, West Riding of Yorkshire. His father, Bernard senior, was an electrician, while his mother Hilda (née Berrington) was from a mill-working family. Brought up as a Catholic, he attended St Bede's Grammar School. His short-sight meant he was unable to serve in the British Army during the Second World War. He trained as an aircraft engineer and draughtsman while undertaking firewatching duties.

Theatre
Hepton trained at the Bradford Civic Playhouse under director Esme Church. He had extensive stage experience as an actor in repertory, especially in Scarborough and York. In 1952, he joined Birmingham Rep under Barry Jackson, later himself becoming the theatre's artistic director in 1957. For a brief period from 1963, he was director of the Liverpool Playhouse, but resigned during his first season. Productions of the Max Frisch play The Fire Raisers and John Osborne's Luther featured in his effort to move the theatre's repertoire beyond its standard fare. He was responsible for arranging the fight sequences in Laurence Olivier's film version of Richard III (1955) and an Old Vic production of Hamlet with Richard Burton in 1953.

Television
On television, he played Caiaphas in the 1969 Dennis Potter play Son of Man. He was cast as the Kommandant in Colditz (1972–74) and later appeared for the same production team as Albert Foiret in three series of Secret Army (1977–79). Before that he made a guest appearance in an episode of the first series of Catweazle (1970) where he played a naturalist. Other notable performances included Thomas Cranmer in both The Six Wives of Henry VIII (1970) and Elizabeth R (1971). He reprised the role in the film adaptation of the former, Henry VIII and His Six Wives (1972). Hepton acted in adaptations of John le Carré's novels, as Toby Esterhase in the BBC Television versions of Tinker, Tailor, Soldier, Spy and Smiley's People, and George Smiley in the radio adaptations. He appeared in I, Claudius (1976) as Pallas and in the comedy series The Squirrels (1974–77).

Having played Inspector Goole in An Inspector Calls (1982) and Sir Thomas Bertram in Mansfield Park (1983), he appeared as Sam Toovey in the 1989 television adaptation of Susan Hill's ghost story The Woman in Black (1989).

Radio and film
On radio, Hepton played the role of Albert, in Stranger in the Home by Alan Dapre, also the role of The Old Man in the Corner, the amateur, and mostly sedentary, sleuth in the BBC Radio 4 dramatic adaption called The Teahouse Detective (1998–2000) by Baroness Orczy. He also starred in Robert Barr's quirky detective radio series "Galbraith" as Inspector Bill Galbraith on BBC radio.

Hepton's appearances in feature films were less frequent, he made his debut in 1949. He made a brief appearance as Thorpey, a gangster, in the classic British film Get Carter (1971), and another small role, as Milton Goldsmith, in Voyage of the Damned (1976).

Personal life and death
Hepton was married to actress Nancie Jackson from 1957 until she died in 1977. Jackson played Thomas More’s wife Alice opposite Hepton as Moore in the 1957 TV movie A Man for All Seasons; Hepton and she settled in Barnes, London. Hepton married Hilary Liddell in 1979; she died in 2013. Hepton died on 27 July 2018, aged 92. He was survived by a niece and nephew.

Filmography

Film credits

A Boy, a Girl and a Bike (1949) as Cyclist (uncredited)
 Richard III (1955) as Soldier (uncredited)
Get Carter (1971) as Thorpe
Henry VIII and His Six Wives (1972) as Archbishop Thomas Cranmer
Barry Lyndon (1975) as Man selling painting to Barry
Voyage of the Damned (1976) as Milton Goldsmith 
The Plague Dogs (1982) as Stephen Powell (voice)
Gandhi (1982) as G.O.C, British army in India
The Holcroft Covenant (1985) as Commander Leighton
Shadey (1985) as Captain Amies 
Stealing Heaven (1988) as Bishop
Eminent Domain (1990) as Slovak
The Baroness and the Pig (2002) as Soames

Television credits

A Man for All Seasons (1957) as Sir Thomas More
The Life of Henry V (1957) as Chorus
Compact (1964) - director, two episodes
Swizzlewick (1964) - producer, 20 episodes
Thursday Theatre (1965) - producer, two episodes 
United! (1965–1966) - producer, 28 episodes
Play of the Month: The Devil's Eggshell (1966) as Lord Portmanteau
Great Expectations (1967) as Wemmick
The Spanish Farm (1968) as Captain Dormer 
Out of the Unknown: The Fosters (1969) as Harry Gerwyn
The Wednesday Play: Son of Man (1969) as Caiaphas
The Elusive Pimpernel (1969) as Chauvelin
W. Somerset Maugham: Lord Mountdrago (1969) as Dr Audlin 
Play For Today: Robin Redbreast (1970) as Fisher
The Six Wives of Henry VIII (1970, in four episodes) as Archbishop Thomas Cranmer
Elizabeth R (1971) as Archbishop Thomas Cranmer
Omnibus: Paradise Restored (1971) as Oliver Cromwell
The Organisation (1972) as Rodney Spurling
Follow the Yellow Brick Road (1972) as Colin Sands
Colditz (1972–1974) as Kommandant
Play of the Month: The Adventures of Don Quixote (1973) as Village Priest
A Pin to See the Peepshow (1973) as Herbert Starling
Some Mothers Do 'Ave 'Em (1973) as Webster 
The Squirrels (1974–1977) as Mr Fletcher
Sadie, It's Cold Outside (1975) as Norman Potter
Orde Wingate (1976) as Palmer
I, Claudius (1976) as Pallas
Secret Army (1977–1979) as Albert Foiret
Tinker Tailor Soldier Spy (1979) as Toby Esterhase
Blood Money (1981) as Det Chief Supt Meadows
Kessler (1981) as Albert Foiret
An Inspector Calls (1982) as Inspector Goole
Smiley's People (1982) as Toby Esterhase
Mansfield Park (1983) as Sir Thomas Bertram
Dear Box Number (1983) as Walter Cartwright
 Cockles (1984) as Sergeant Naughton
A Profile of Arthur J. Mason (1984) as Arthur J. Mason
Bleak House (1985) as Krook
Bergerac (1985) as Sir Geoffrey Newton 
Honour, Profit and Pleasure (1985) as Bishop of London
The Disputation (1986) as Raymund de Penjaforte 
The Life and Loves of a She-Devil (1986) as Judge Bissop 
The Lady's Not for Burning (1987) as Hebble Tyson
The Charmer (1987) as Donald Stimpson
The Contract (1988) as Henry Carter
The Woman in Black (1989) as Sam Toovey
A Perfect Hero (1991) as Arthur Fleming 
The Old Devils (1992) as Malcolm Cellan-Davies
Dandelion Dead (1994) as Mr Davies
Emma (1996) as Mr Woodhouse
Midsomer Murders: Death of a Hollow Man (1998) as Harold Winstanley
Heartbeat: Bread & Circuses (2002) as Colonel Barber/James Barker

References

External links
Bernard Hepton at the British Film Institute

Bernard Hepton at .aveleyman.com

1925 births
2018 deaths
English male film actors
English male radio actors
English male stage actors
English male television actors
People educated at St. Bede's Grammar School
Male actors from Bradford